is a Japanese former professional baseball catcher. He has played in Nippon Professional Baseball (NPB) for the Tohoku Rakuten Golden Eagles, Yomiuri Giants and Tokyo Yakult Swallows.

On November 2, Ino announced his retirement.

References

External links

 NPB.com

1983 births
Living people
Baseball people from Gunma Prefecture
Japanese baseball players
Nippon Professional Baseball catchers
Tohoku Rakuten Golden Eagles players
Yomiuri Giants players
Tokyo Yakult Swallows players